FC Neftekhimik Nizhnekamsk is an association football club from Nizhnekamsk, Russia, founded in 1991. It played at the second-highest level in the Russian First League in 1993–1998, 2001–2004, 2012 to 2013–14, 2016–17 and from 2019–to present.  Neftekhimik has won 5 Second Division titles.

It has been a farm club of FC Rubin Kazan since 2007.

Current squad
As of 16 February 2023, according to the official First League website.

Notable players
Had international caps for their respective countries. Players whose name is listed in bold represented their countries while playing for Neftekhimik .

Russia/USSR
 Valeri Chizhov
 Vladislav Ignatyev
 Ruslan Kambolov
 Lyubomir Kantonistov
 Daler Kuzyayev
 Igor Portnyagin
 Yegor Sorokin
 Vasili Zhupikov

Former USSR countries
 Stanislav Buchnev
 Rizvan Umarov
 Pavel Kirylchyk

 Artur Krivonos
 Alyaksandr Oreshnikow
 Giorgi Janelidze
 Mamuka Kobakhidze
 Solomon Kvirkvelia
 Giorgi Megreladze
 Vaso Sepashvili
 Maksim Shevchenko
 Jurijs Hudjakovs
 Konstantīns Igošins
 Vladimirs Kamešs
 Aleksejs Šarando
 Sergejs Tarasovs
 Vitālijs Teplovs

 Umed Alidodov
 Iskandar Dzhalilov
 Manuchekhr Dzhalilov
 Parvizdzhon Umarbayev
 Farkhod Vosiyev
 Pavel Kharchik
 Wahyt Orazsähedow
 Ulugbek Bakayev
 Bobir Davlatov
 Vagiz Galiulin
 Aleksey Polyakov

South and Central America
 Walter Chalá

External links
Official website

Association football clubs established in 1991
Football clubs in Russia
Sport in Tatarstan
1991 establishments in Russia